The canton of Sud-Bergeracois is an administrative division of the Dordogne department, southwestern France. It was created at the French canton reorganisation which came into effect in March 2015. Its seat is in Eymet.

It consists of the following communes:

Bardou
Boisse
Bouniagues
Colombier
Conne-de-Labarde
Cunèges
Eymet
Faurilles
Faux
Fonroque
Gageac-et-Rouillac
Issigeac
Mescoules
Monbazillac
Monestier
Monmadalès
Monmarvès
Monsaguel
Montaut
Plaisance
Pomport
Razac-d'Eymet
Razac-de-Saussignac
Ribagnac
Rouffignac-de-Sigoulès
Sadillac
Saint-Aubin-de-Cadelech
Saint-Aubin-de-Lanquais
Saint-Capraise-d'Eymet
Saint-Cernin-de-Labarde
Sainte-Radegonde
Saint-Julien-Innocence-Eulalie
Saint-Léon-d'Issigeac
Saint-Perdoux
Saussignac
Serres-et-Montguyard
Sigoulès-et-Flaugeac
Singleyrac
Thénac

References

Cantons of Dordogne